Kenny Lowe (born 6 November 1961) is an English association football manager and former player. He is the current manager of Australian side Perth RedStar.

Kenny played for ten clubs in England, and had a stint in Australia also. He later managed Gateshead and Barrow before returning to Perth to work in football, where he would undertake a five-year tenure as the manager of A-League side Perth Glory.

Playing career
Lowe played for ten clubs during his career, which started on a part-time basis in 1981 with Hartlepool United, while he served an apprenticeship as a pipe-fitter and welder with ICI. He moved to Australia in 1986 to play for Spearwood Dalmatinacs in the Western Australia Premier League before returning to England. He was twice signed by manager Barry Fry, first for £40,000 for Barnet in 1991 and secondly at Birmingham City for £75,000, when at the age of 31 he turned professional. He finally ended his career at the age of 39. He also won two caps with the England semi-professional team.

Managerial career
Lowe started his managerial career with Gateshead as joint manager with Matty Pearson. He returned to Barrow in 1999 when the club had just four players. He stayed at Barrow for four seasons during which time they remained in administration.

He left Barrow to move to Australia where he was appointed assistant manager at Perth Glory. He also coaches at the Football West national training centre, taking charge of the team in inter-state matches.

Following the sacking of Alistair Edwards as Perth Glory's head coach, Lowe was appointed as the caretaker coach.

On 22 April 2014 Lowe was appointed as full-time coach of Perth Glory, after winning just 4 of 17 games as caretaker coach. In his first full season in charge of the Glory he led them to the final of the 2014 FFA Cup. On 20 April 2018 Lowe was sacked as the head coach of Perth and was appointed technical director of the club's academy. Lowe departed as the Glory's longest serving A-League manager.

On 13 November 2018, Lowe was appointed as an assistant coach of the Socceroos for their friendlies in November. He continued in this role for the Socceroos' Asian Cup defence in January.

Personal life
He was born in Sedgefield, County Durham, and now lives in Perth, Western Australia. His sister Kendra Slawinski was an English international netball player.

Career statistics
Source:

Managerial statistics

Honours
Individual
PFA Team of the Year: 1991–92 Fourth Division, 1992–93 Third Division

References

External links

Kenny Lowe career stats

1961 births
Living people
People from Billingham
Footballers from County Durham
A-League Men managers
English footballers
English football managers
England semi-pro international footballers
Hartlepool United F.C. players
Billingham Town F.C. players
Gateshead F.C. players
Barrow A.F.C. players
Scarborough F.C. players
Barnet F.C. players
Stoke City F.C. players
Birmingham City F.C. players
Carlisle United F.C. players
Darlington F.C. players
English Football League players
Gateshead F.C. managers
Barrow A.F.C. managers
Perth Glory FC managers
Sportspeople from Yorkshire
Association football midfielders